The John S. McCain National Defense Authorization Act for Fiscal Year 2019 (NDAA 2019) is a United States federal law which specifies the budget, expenditures and policies of the U.S. Department of Defense (DOD) for fiscal year 2019. It was signed by President Donald Trump during a ceremony in Fort Drum, New York on August 13, 2018.

Background 

A Senate version of the bill contained provisions blocking a proposed settlement to lift an export denial order affecting Chinese telecommunications equipment company ZTE. The provision was not included in the final version, but section 889 does maintain a provision banning the federal government from purchasing equipment from certain Chinese vendors due to security concerns, including Huawei and ZTE, as well as any surveillance equipment for the purposes of national security from Dahua Technology, Hytera, and Hikvision.

Legislative history

House vote 
H.R.5515, the version of the NDAA 2019 which was reported by the House Armed Services Committee, was passed by the House of Representatives on July 26, 2018 in a 359–54 vote.

Senate vote 
The Senate passed it on August 1, 2018 with a vote of 87–10.

Presidential signature 
President Donald Trump signed the NDAA 2019 into law on August 13, 2018.

Legal history 
Section 8005 of the 2019 NDAA became a key component of the legal conflict over allocation of funds for construction of the Mexico–United States barrier between the Trump administration, a coalition of several states, and several non-governmental organizations. After failing to have obtain funding for the wall from other appropriations bills by the end of 2019, Trump signed the National Emergency Concerning the Southern Border of the United States on February 15, 2019 to state that building the wall was a national emergency. The legal challenge, Trump v. Sierra Club, has currently been accepted by the Supreme Court to be heard during the 2020-21 term.

References

External links
 John S. McCain National Defense Authorization Act for Fiscal Year 2019 (PDF/details) as amended in the GPO Statute Compilations collection
 John S. McCain National Defense Authorization Act for Fiscal Year 2019 (PDF) as enacted in the US Statutes at Large

National Defense Authorization Act for Fiscal Year 2019
Acts of the 115th United States Congress